Julie De Wilde (born 8 December 2002) is a Belgian professional racing cyclist, who currently rides for UCI Women's Continental Team Plantur–Pura in road cycling, and in cyclo-cross for UCI Cyclo-cross team IKO–Crelan. 

Turning professional in 2019, she joined the Doltcini - NM Transport team. Later that year, she won the Belgian junior time trial title, before finishing 2nd at the 2019 UCI World Championships - Junior women's road race in Yorkshire, and placing 5th at the 2019 European Road Championships. Despite a disrupted 2020 season due to the COVID-19 pandemic, she won the Belgian National junior Cyclo-cross Championship. She joined the Plantur–Pura team at the start of 2021, taking part in her first UCI Women's World Tour event later that year. In 2022, she finished second at Dwars door Vlaanderen in Belgium, before wearing the white jersey at the Tour de France Femmes for three stages as the best placed rider under the age of 23.

Major results
2022
1st Grisette Grand Prix de Wallonie
2nd Dwars door Vlaanderen 
Tour de France Femmes
Held  after stages 3–5

References

External links 

 Julie De Wilde at ProCyclingStats
 Julie De Wilde at Cycling Archives

Living people
2002 births
Cyclo-cross cyclists
Belgian female cyclists
Sportspeople from Ghent
Cyclists from East Flanders